Skuhrov is a municipality and village in Havlíčkův Brod District in the Vysočina Region of the Czech Republic. It has about 300 inhabitants.

References

Villages in Havlíčkův Brod District